The Central District of Khonj County is a district (bakhsh) in Khonj County, Fars Province, Iran. At the 2006 census, its population was 30,779, in 5,544 families.  The District has one city: Khonj. The District has two rural districts (dehestan): Seyfabad Rural District and Tang-e Narak Rural District.

References 

Khonj County
Districts of Fars Province